These are the official results of the Women's 1,500 metres event at the 1987 IAAF World Championships in Rome, Italy. There were a total of 32 participating athletes and one non-starter, with three qualifying heats and the final held on Saturday 1987-09-05.

Medalists

Records
Existing records at the start of the event.

Final

Note Sandra Gasser was the original winner of the bronze medal in 3:59.06 but was disqualified for doping.

Qualifying heats
Held on Thursday 1987-09-03

See also
 1982 Women's European Championships 1500 metres (Athens)
 1983 Women's World Championships 1500 metres (Helsinki)
 1984 Women's Olympic 1500 metres (Los Angeles)
 1986 Women's European Championships 1500 metres (Stuttgart)
 1988 Women's Olympic 1500 metres (Seoul)
 1990 Women's European Championships 1500 metres (Split)
 1992 Women's Olympic 1500 metres (Barcelona)

References
 Results

 
1500 metres at the World Athletics Championships
1987 in women's athletics